I'm No Angel is a 1933 pre-Code film directed by Wesley Ruggles, and starring Mae West and Cary Grant. West received sole story and screenplay credit. It is one of her films that was not subjected to heavy censorship.

Plot

Tira (Mae West) shimmies and sings in the sideshow of Big Bill Barton's Wonder Show, while her current boyfriend, pickpocket "Slick" (Ralf Harolde), relieves her distracted audience of their valuables for Big Bill (Edward Arnold). One of the rich customers, Ernest Brown, arranges a private rendezvous, during which Slick barges in and attempts to run a badger game on the customer. The customer threatens to call the cops, so Slick whacks him over the head with a bottle. Mistakenly thinking he has killed the man, Slick flees, but is caught and jailed.

Fearing that Slick will implicate her, Tira asks Big Bill for a loan to retain her lawyer, Bennie Pinkowitz (Gregory Ratoff). He agrees on condition that she does her lion taming act, which includes putting her head into the mouth of one of the beasts, promising her that it will get her (and him) to the "Big Show". It does. (West did some of her own stunts, including riding an elephant into the ring.)

Tira's fame takes her to New York City, where wealthy Kirk Lawrence (Kent Taylor) is smitten, despite being engaged to snobbish socialite Alicia Hatton (Gertrude Michael). He showers her with expensive gifts. Kirk's friend and even richer cousin, Jack Clayton (Cary Grant), goes to see Tira to ask her to leave Kirk and his fiancée alone. He ends up falling for her himself. Tira and Jack’s romance leads to a wedding engagement.

Tira tells Big Bill she is quitting to get married. Unwilling to lose his prize act, he has Slick, recently released from prison, sneak into Tira's penthouse suite, where Jack finds him in his robe. As a result, Jack breaks off the engagement. Tira sues Jack for breach of promise. The defense tries to use her past relationships to discredit her, but the judge allows her to cross examine the witnesses herself and in doing so she wins over not only the judge and jury, but also Jack. Jack agrees to give her a big settlement check. When he goes to see her, Tira tears up the check, and the two reconcile.

Context
I'm No Angel was released immediately after She Done Him Wrong, when Mae West was one of the nation's biggest box office attractions and its most controversial star. In the early 1930s, West's films were an important factor in saving Paramount Pictures from bankruptcy. During the difficult times of the Great Depression, many filmgoers responded enthusiastically to West, especially to her portrayal of a woman "from the wrong side of the tracks" achieving success both economically and socially.

Cary Grant starred opposite her for the second and final time; their first film together had been She Done Him Wrong. Grant remained annoyed for decades that West often took credit for his career despite the fact that he had made major films before.  The smash hit Blonde Venus, starring Marlene Dietrich and Cary Grant, predates She Done Him Wrong by a year even though Mae West always claimed to have discovered Grant for her film, amusingly elaborating that up until then he had only made "some tests with starlets."  She would frequently claim to various reporters through the years that she spotted him as an unknown walking across a parking lot, asked who he was (nobody knew according to her story) and stated that, "If he can talk, I'll use him in my next picture." This tale remains routinely incorporated into most magazine articles about either West or Grant to this day.

West's ribald satire outraged moralists. Film historians cite her as one of the factors for the strict Hollywood production code that soon followed.  The Hays Office forced a few changes, including the title of the song "No One Does It Like a Dallas Man", altered to "No One Loves Me Like a Dallas Man". David Niven claims, in an interview on Parkinson, that the Hays Office changed the title from "It Ain't No Sin".

Cast

 Mae West as Tira
 Cary Grant as Jack Clayton
 Gregory Ratoff as Benny Pinkowitz
 Edward Arnold as "Big Bill" Barton
 Ralf Harolde as "Slick" Wiley
 Kent Taylor as Kirk Lawrence
 Gertrude Michael as Alicia Hatton
 Russell Hopton as "Flea" Madigan
 Dorothy Peterson as Thelma
 William B. Davidson as Ernest Brown (as Wm. B. Davidson)
 Gertrude Howard as Beulah Thorndyke, Tira's main maid
 Libby Taylor as Libby, Tira's hairdressing maid
 Hattie McDaniel as Tira's manicurist (uncredited)
 Irving Pichel as Clayton's lawyer (uncredited)
 Walter Walker as the judge (uncredited)

Reception
The film was Paramount's biggest hit of the year. It was also Franklin Roosevelt's favourite film.

Signature Mae West lines 
 "Oh, Beulah, peel me a grape!"
 "Well, it's not the men in your life that counts, it's the life in your men." This line was nominated for the American Film Institute's 2005 list AFI's 100 Years...100 Movie Quotes.
 "When I'm good I'm very good. But when I'm bad I'm better."

Soundtrack 
 "They Call Me Sister Honky-Tonk" (1933) (uncredited)
 Music by Harvey Oliver Brooks
 Lyrics by Gladys DuBois and Ben Ellison
 Sung by Mae West
 "That Dallas Man" (1933) (uncredited)
 Music by Harvey Oliver Brooks
 Lyrics by Gladys DuBois and Ben Ellison
 Played on a record on which Mae West sings
 "I Found a New Way to Go to Town" (1933) (uncredited)
 Music by Harvey Oliver Brooks
 Lyrics by Gladys DuBois and Ben Ellison
 Sung by Mae West
 "I Want You, I Need You" (1933) (uncredited)
 Music by Harvey Oliver Brooks
 Lyrics by Ben Ellison
 Played on a piano and sung by Mae West
 "I'm No Angel" (1933) (uncredited)
 Music by Harvey Oliver Brooks
 Lyrics by Gladys DuBois and Ben Ellison
 Sung by Mae West at the end and during the closing credits

References

Bibliography 
 When I'm Bad, I'm Better: Mae West, Sex, and American Entertainment, by Marybeth Hamilton (Berkeley: University of California Press, 1997). 
 Goodness Had Nothing to Do with It, by Mae West (Avon: 1959). ASIN B0007HCX2O
 Mae West: A Bio-Bibliography, by Carol M. Ward (New York: Greenwood Press, 1989). 
 The Complete Films of Mae West, by Jon Tuska (Secaucus, NJ: Carol Pub. Group, 1992).

External links 

 
 
 
 
 Reel Classics
 The New York Times
 Cary Grant.net republished original Variety and New York Times reviews
 Filmsite.org review

1933 films
1930s romantic musical films
1933 romantic comedy films
American black-and-white films
American musical comedy films
American romantic comedy films
Circus films
Films directed by Wesley Ruggles
Films set in New York City
Paramount Pictures films
Films with screenplays by Mae West
1933 musical comedy films
American romantic musical films
1930s English-language films
1930s American films